The Brazilian National Council of Energy Policy (CNPE) was created by the law no. 9.478/1997, also known as Petroleum Law. The council is the governmental organization of Brazil responsible for advising the Presidency of the Republic and has the objective of elaborating policies for the electric sector of the country.

CNPE is formed by state government representatives, experts in energy, non-governmental organizations and seven ministers.

References

Energy in Brazil
Executive branch of Brazil
Energy policy